Catalabus is a genus of leaf rolling weevils in the beetle family Attelabidae. There are about nine described species in Catalabus.

Species
These nine species belong to the genus Catalabus:
 Catalabus elegans (Voss, 1933)
 Catalabus kazantsevi (Legalov, 2003)
 Catalabus marieae (Kresl, 2007)
 Catalabus nigrosuturalis (Voss, 1930)
 Catalabus pallidipennis (Voss, 1925)
 Catalabus quadriplagiatus (Voss, 1953)
 Catalabus rasuwanus Legalov, 2007
 Catalabus simulatus (G.A.K. Marshall, 1923)

References

Attelabidae